East Baghdad Field is a group of oil fields, located east of Baghdad, Iraq.

In December 2009, despite previous negotiations with Japan's Petroleum Exploration Company, JAPEX, there were no bids to work on the oil field. Iraq's Ministry of Oil will likely work the site instead.

See also

 Baghdad

References

Oil fields of Iraq